Kurkinskaya is a rural locality (a village) in Troitskoye Rural Settlement, Ust-Kubinsky District, Vologda Oblast, Russia. The population was 99 as of 2002.

Geography 
Kurkinskaya is located 44 km northwest of Ustye (the district's administrative centre) by road. Berzhnoye is the nearest rural locality.

References 

Rural localities in Ust-Kubinsky District